Datuk Rozman Isli is a Malaysian politician who served as the Member of Parliament (MP) for Labuan from May 2013 to November 2022. He is a member and Division Chairman of Labuan of the Heritage Party (WARISAN), a party aligned with the Pakatan Harapan (PH) opposition coalition and was a member of the United Malays National Organisation (UMNO), a component party of the ruling BN coalition which is aligned with the ruling Gabungan Rakyat Sabah (GRS) coalition. He was elected in the 2013 and 2018 general elections on the BN ticket. However, in October 2018, he left BN and UMNO for WARISAN. On 31 March 2019, he won the party position of the Division Chairman of Labuan of WARISAN by walkover. He was also the Chairman of Labuan Corporation Advisory Council from 2018 to 2020.

Election results

Honours
 :
 Medallist of the Order of the Defender of the Realm (PPN) (2010)
 :
 Commander of the Order of the Territorial Crown (PMW) - Datuk (2014)

References

External links 
 Rozman Isli on Facebook

Living people
People from Labuan
Malaysian politicians
Year of birth missing (living people)
Medallists of the Order of the Defender of the Realm
Former United Malays National Organisation politicians
Sabah Heritage Party politicians